New Star Games is a British independent video game developer specialising in sports role-playing video games. It was founded by Simon Read in 2003.

Their most well-known product is the New Star Soccer series, role-playing football games in which the user controls one player in a squad, making decisions about his career and lifestyle along the way. The game received the "Indie Sports Game of the Year Award 2008" from GameTunnel. It was the first non-text based game released by New Star Games.

In addition to sports career games, New Star Games notably released Super Laser Racer, a stylised futuristic combat racing game. This was the first of the developer's games to be made available on Steam. Simon Read approached Steam with New Star Soccer 5, but Valve were apparently not interested in distributing it, a decision they would later reverse.

In 2013, the mobile version of New Star Soccer received a BAFTA Game Award in the Sports/Fitness category.

The company also experienced success with their 2020 game Retro Bowl, which at its peak became the most downloaded game on the Apple App Store.

Games
New Star Soccer
New Star Soccer 2
New Star Soccer 3
Sensational Soccer
New Star Soccer 4
New Star Soccer 5
New Star Tennis
New Star Hockey
New Star GP
Super Laser Racer
New Star Soccer G-Story
Euro Cup Manager
World Cup Manager
New Star Cricket
New Star Manager
Buoyant
Retro Bowl
New Star Baseball
Retro Goal

References

External links
New Star Games official website
List of New Star Games from MobyGames

Video game development companies
Video game companies of the United Kingdom
Video game companies established in 2003
British companies established in 2003